Germany was one of the host nations of the inaugural 2018 European Championships in Berlin, Germany and Glasgow, United Kingdom. Germany competed at the championships which lasted from 2 to 12 August 2018. Germany competed in 7 sports.

Medallists

|  style="text-align:left; width:70%; vertical-align:top;"|

* Participated in the heats only and received medals.
|  style="text-align:left; width:22%; vertical-align:top;"|

See also
Germany at the 2018 European Athletics Championships

References

External links
 European Championships official site 

2018
Nations at the 2018 European Championships
2018 in German sport